Catherine Malfitano (born April 18, 1948) is an American operatic soprano and opera director. Malfitano was born in New York City, the daughter of a ballet dancer mother, Maria Maslova, and a violinist father, Joseph Malfitano. She attended the High School of Music and Art and studied at the Frank Corsaro Studio and Manhattan School of Music, graduating in 1971. She often mentions that she was rejected from The Juilliard School.

Operatic career
Malfitano made her professional singing debut in 1972 at the Central City Opera playing the role of Nannetta in Verdi's Falstaff. She soon appeared with Minnesota Opera, where she sang in the world premiere of Conrad Susa's Transformations and, in 1974 at New York City Opera, in La bohème, as Mimi. She then appeared with the Lyric Opera of Chicago (1975) and at the Royal Opera House (1976) and in other major European opera houses 1974 Susanna in a new production of Le nozze di Figaro at The Holland Festival, 1976 Servilia in a new production of La Clemenza di Tito at The Salzburg Festival. In 1978, Malfitano achieved wider recognition in a telecast of Gian Carlo Menotti's The Saint of Bleecker Street from NYCO, playing Annina., as well as Rose in Kurt Weill's Street Scene on Live from Lincoln Center in 1979.

Since then, Malfitano has sung at the major opera houses throughout the world, including the Metropolitan Opera in New York City, Teatro alla Scala in Milan, Royal Opera House in London, Théâtre du Châtelet in Paris, Théâtre Royal de la Monnaie in Brussels, Grand Théâtre de Genève in Geneva, Teatro Comunale in Florence, Gran Teatre del Liceu, Berlin State Opera, Wiener Staatsoper in Vienna, Bayerische Staatsoper in Munich, Paris Opéra, Hamburgische Staatsoper in Hamburg, De Nederlandse Opera in Amsterdam as well as the Lyric Opera of Chicago, the San Francisco Opera, the Los Angeles Opera, the Houston Grand Opera and the Salzburg Festival.

One of Malfitano's best-known roles is the title role in the opera Tosca, for which she won an Emmy Award in 1992, performing opposite Plácido Domingo as Mario Cavaradossi and Ruggero Raimondi as Scarpia. The opera was broadcast live from the actual Roman settings of the opera and viewed by viewers worldwide. She is also associated with the title role in Richard Strauss's Salome, notably for performing the "Dance of the Seven Veils" ending the dance completely nude, a rarity in opera. She was also Jenny in Kurt Weill's Aufstieg und Fall der Stadt Mahagonny (Rise and Fall of the City of Mahagonny).

Throughout her career, Malfitano has championed the music of American composers, including Carlisle Floyd, William Bolcom, Conrad Susa and Thomas Pasatieri.

In 2005, Malfitano started a second career as an opera director, with a Madama Butterfly for Central City Opera (the company with which she made her professional singing debut in 1972).  Since then, she has created productions for La Monnaie, Florida Grand Opera, Washington National Opera, San Francisco Opera's Merola programme, English National Opera, the Lyric Opera of Chicago and the Canadian Opera Company.

She is currently a member of the voice faculty at Manhattan School of Music along with Cynthia Hoffmann, Edith Bers, Marlena Malas, and others.

Repertory
She has sung over 70 roles throughout her career and continues to add more in her repertoire. Her repertory includes:

Selected discography

Record

 Catherine Malfitano, Joseph Malfitano Music For Voice and Violin, MHS/Musical Heritage Society Inc., 1974.
 Gounod Roméo et Juliette, EMI, 1983
 Monteverdi L'incoronazione di Poppea, Poppea, CBS, 1985
 Richard Strauss Salome, Polygram, 1995.
 Puccini Tosca, Teldec, 1996.
 Rossini Stabat Mater, EMI/Angel/Virgin, 1996.
 Christoph Willibald Gluck Orfeo ed Euridice, Gala, 2000.
 William Bolcom  A View from the Bridge, New World, 2001.

Video
 Blue Moon Cat: Catherine Malfitano Live at Joe's Pub, Video Arts International, 2001
 Songs My Father Taught Me, Video Arts International, 2002
 The Metropolitan Opera Centennial Gala (1983), Deutsche Grammophon, 00440-073-4538, 2009
 James Levine's 25th Anniversary Metropolitan Opera Gala (1996), Deutsche Grammophon DVD, B0004602-09, 2005
 Verdi Stiffelio (1993), Opus Arte DVD, OA R3103 D, 2008
 Puccini Tosca (1992), Teldec Warner Classics DVD/BR, 2564-64529-2

References

External links
Official website
Biography in IMG Artists site
Biography from Fortunecity.com

Interview with Catherine Malfitano, December 7, 1985

American operatic sopranos
American opera directors
Female opera directors
The High School of Music & Art alumni
Living people
1948 births
Manhattan School of Music alumni
Singers from New York City
Manhattan School of Music faculty
20th-century American women opera singers
21st-century American women opera singers
Classical musicians from New York (state)
Women music educators
American women academics